Frederick Lawrence "Freddy" Williams  (born February 24, 1962 in Cape Town, South Africa) is a Canadian track and field athlete, known for running middle distances.  He represented Canada in the 1992 Olympics running the 800 metres and anchoring the Canadian 4 x 400 metres relay team.  He also ran in the IAAF World Championships in Athletics, in both 1991 and as a 6th place finalist in 1993 beating the 1992 Olympic gold medalist William Tanui in the process.

He was a home town finalist in the 1993 IAAF World Indoor Championships in Toronto.

While running for Abilene Christian University, he was the 1986 NCAA Champion.

References

External links

1962 births
Living people
Sportspeople from Cape Town
South African emigrants to Canada
Athletes (track and field) at the 1992 Summer Olympics
Canadian male middle-distance runners
Abilene Christian University alumni
Olympic track and field athletes of Canada
Track and field athletes from Ontario
Black Canadian track and field athletes
World Athletics Championships athletes for Canada